The Makerere University School of Biomedical Sciences (MakSBS) is one of the four schools that comprise the Makerere University College of Health Sciences (MakCHS), a semi-autonomous constituent college of Makerere University, Uganda's oldest university. Between 1924 and 2007, the school was part of the Makerere University School of Medicine and constituted the pre-clinical departments of anatomy, biochemistry, physiology, pharmacology, microbiology, and pathology. In 2007, those departments were organized into a separate school. MakSBS provides biomedical education at the undergraduate and postgraduate levels.

Dean: Prof. Moses L. Joloba

Website: sbs.mak.ac.ug

Location
The school's campus is located on Mulago Hill, in north-east Kampala, Uganda's capital and largest city. The location is close to the other schools of the College of Health Sciences and is adjacent to the Mulago Hospital Complex, the teaching hospital of MakCHS. The coordinates of the school are: 00° 20' 17"N, 32° 34' 38"S (Latitude:0.3381, Longitude:32.5772)

Overview
MakSBS is one of the schools that constitute MakCHS, a constituent semi-autonomous college of Makerere University. The schools of the college include:

 Makerere University School of Biomedical Sciences
 Makerere University School of Health Sciences
 Makerere University School of Medicine
 Makerere University School of Public Health

The college is headed by a principal and a deputy principal, while each school is headed by a dean.

Departments
As of September 2009, the following departments constituted MakSBS:

 Department of Human Anatomy
 Department of Biochemistry
 Department of Medical Microbiology
 Department of Pathology
 Department of Pharmacology and Therapeutics
 Department of Physiology

Undergraduate Courses
The following undergraduate courses are offered at MakSBS:
 
 Bachelor of Science in biomedical sciences
 Bachelor of Science in biomedical engineering
 Bachelor of Science in medical illustration
 Bachelor of Science in cytotechnology

Graduate courses
The following graduate courses are offered at MakSBS:

 The East African Diploma in Tropical Medicine and Hygiene
 Master of Science in anatomy
 Master of Science in biochemistry
 Master of Science in medical illustration
 Master of Science in pharmacology
 Master of Science in physiology
 Master of Medicine in microbiology
 Master of Science in immunology and clinical microbiology
 Master of Medicine in pathology
 Doctor of Philosophy in any of the school's disciplines

See also
 Education in Uganda
 Makerere University College of Health Sciences

References

External links
 Makerere University Homepage

Makerere University
Kawempe Division